Route 915 is a  long provincial highway located entirely in Albert County, New Brunswick, Canada. The highway begins at Route 114 in Alma and travels along the northwestern shores of the Bay of Fundy before turning back north to end at Route 114 in south Riverside-Albert.

Route description
Route 915 begins at a y intersection with Route 114 in Alma, along a roadway named Scenic Drive. The route travels northwest through woodlands before approaching the community of Waterside. The highway sits on the near the tidal flats of the Bay of Fundy until it reaches Cape Enrage, where it turns further inland. The highway continues through several small villages along the bay before turning north before crossing over a small creek that flows into the bay, terminating again at Route 114 south of Riverside-Albert.

Major intersections

References

915
915